Robert "Rocket" Romano, M.D., F.A.C.S. is a fictional character in the medical drama ER, portrayed by American actor Paul McCrane. He was introduced in the fourth season as a recurring character. He evolves from being a surgical attending physician to Chief of Staff at Chicago's County General Hospital, with McCrane being promoted to series regular from the sixth season until his death in the tenth season. 

Known for his sarcastic and nasty comments, Romano provides an antagonistic force during his time in the series.

McCrane returned to make one further guest appearance in the final season.

Development
Romano was a recurring character during the fourth and fifth seasons of the series. He became a regular character during the sixth-season premiere. In a script from the sixth season, Romano is described as having "no soul".

In an interview with the Orlando Sentinel, McCrane discussed the sequence in which Romano loses his arm in a helicopter accident during the ninth season premiere. McCrane explained: "In terms of my action, I stood up, continuing a motion of having picked up this chart that fell on the tarmac. I swung my arm up and was yanked back by a cable [...] and at whatever point would have been accurate, when my arm was on its way up, they painted in the dismembered part flying up and off camera." McCrane's arm was hidden while there was a prothesis fitted over his shoulder. According to The New York Times, it took McCrane just 20 minutes to shoot, but digitally creating and animating the helicopter, the blood, the wind and the Chicago skyline took the Stargate team a full week.

The character was killed off halfway through the tenth season. McCrane was disappointed by the producers' decision, but knew his character "had run its course". Producer Chris Chulack went on by stating "Even a horrific helicopter accident last season - in which his arm was severed, ending his career as a surgeon - could not curtail his inappropriate, sarcastic remarks. There wasn't much to be done."

After McCrane left the main cast of ER, he went on to direct multiple episodes of the series along with Laura Innes after her departure in Season 13.

Character history
Romano is introduced in the fourth season's episode "Good Touch, Bad Touch" as a surgical attending sponsoring Elizabeth Corday's internship in the Chicago ER. Romano is a brilliant surgeon, but does not get along with the majority of the staff, except for Corday whose early quarreling and professional setbacks at Romano's hands such as discontinuing her fellowship had blossomed into a respected friendship over the years. He is portrayed as obnoxious and ambitious, and is eager to jump at the job of interim ER Chief to help weasel his way toward the top of the administrative ladder.

In the fifth season, Dr. Maggie Doyle accuses Dr. Romano of sexual harassment and when she asks Elizabeth to back up her claims, she decides not to after Romano blackmails Elizabeth about her relationship with Dr. Peter Benton. Romano becomes the Acting ER Chief when Dr. Donald Anspaugh mentions he cannot cope with being the Acting Chief as well as his other jobs much to the dismay of the ER staff.

The character is promoted to series regular in the sixth season. He is hired as the new chief of staff, much to the dismay of the entire staff, but it was good news for Elizabeth because he promoted her to Associate Chief of Surgery. Kerry Weaver had originally backed him for the job, backstabbing Mark Greene in the process and earning the permanent ER Chief position, but soon becomes disgusted with him after seeing his diabolical ways which included him suspending her later in the season after she treated a comatose, brain-damaged young woman without HMO approval. He starts to grow fond of medical student Lucy Knight after she convinces him to do a heart operation on a patient on Christmas Eve. He, along with Elizabeth, treats Lucy after she is brutally stabbed by a schizophrenic patient. When Lucy dies despite their feverish work to save her, he angrily throws a surgical tray in his grief and, later in the episode, is found by Weaver closing Lucy's chest incision by himself.

In the seventh season, when Benton arranges for the surgery of a Medicare patient over Romano's objections, Romano fires Benton and then blacklists him throughout the community, making it almost impossible for him to find a job in Chicago which forced Benton to come back and accept a daily call, no-benefits job from Romano. After Benton impresses Romano by keeping his mouth shut and doing the job, Romano "rewards" him with a raise and benefits but also manipulates him into taking on a new post related to affirmative action at County (but is then outmaneuvered when Benton gets a talented African-American student a previously-denied interview, and the student is then accepted into medical school). In addition, Romano stops at nothing to fire Dr. Kim Legaspi, a psychiatric attending and love interest of Weaver. The two both realize that she was being discriminated against for her homosexuality by Romano and Kerry came out of the closet to Romano when announcing she would defend Kim. In "Survival of the Fittest," a pregnant Elizabeth performs a grueling surgery just to prove to Romano that she can. To Elizabeth's surprise, Romano has dinner delivered to the hospital for her afterwards in an unexpected but genuine gesture of kindness. Earlier in the season when Elizabeth had lost her confidence performing an operation that resulted in the paralysis of the patient, Romano ignored her pages for assistance in performing the same type of surgery in order to get her confident in her abilities once again. He watched from the viewing gallery. 

In the next season, Kim moves to San Francisco and Romano surprisingly decides to keep Kerry's secret. Romano continues to be arrogant and insensitive throughout the season, but surprisingly shows a soft side when Elizabeth has a hard time with Mark Greene's decision to discontinue his brain cancer treatment.

In the first episode of season nine, Romano, Luka Kovac, and Susan Lewis are evacuating the hospital due to a Monkey Pox outbreak. While they are on the helipad to load a patient onto a waiting helicopter, the wind blows the chart off the gurney; when Romano moves to retrieve it, the helicopter rotor severs his arm. Lewis and Kovac rush to save his life. Although they manage to reattach the arm, Romano begins to lose motion and sensation in it. He is later removed from his Chief of Staff position by Dr. Anspaugh. Weaver takes over and offers Romano the position of Chief of the ER. During that time, he fires senior nurses Lydia Wright, Conni Oligario, and Yosh Takata. He shows one of his last moments of kindness on the episode “A Hopeless Wound” when Elizabeth Corday loses her wedding ring down the scrub sink drain and fears it will be lost because maintenance is closed until morning. After she finishes a surgery, he returns the ring to her, having used a laparoscope and grabber to retrieve it from the drain. Towards the end of the season, Romano suffers severe burns to his arm without feeling them, prompting him to decide to have it amputated.

In the tenth season, Romano gets a robotic arm. In the episode "Freefall," he is killed when a helicopter falls off the hospital roof and crushes him. Prior to his death, he had intended to lodge a complaint against Dr. Greg Pratt and caught Dr. Archie Morris smoking pot. He leaves a large amount of money to the hospital in his will, which Weaver uses to fund a gay and lesbian medical program. In "Missing," Elizabeth tries to organize a memorial for Romano, but finds that she is the only person that actually misses him. A plaque honoring Romano is mounted on the wall between the two main elevators, then later taken down and put into storage after a shootout in the ER.

Romano reappears in the final season in a flashback, talking with Dr. Greene by Trauma 1 about his chemotherapy. In the episode "The Book of Abby," long-serving nurse Haleh Adams showed Abby Lockhart the Wall of Doctors and on there, the tag "Romano" can be seen.

Reception
In his book Writing for Visual Media, author Anthony Friedmann calls Romano a "mocking, sarcastic, nasty guy." Romano is described as a "boss from hell" by Stephen Battaglio in Los Angeles Times, while he was reviewing the characters' death. Romano's death was described by Michael Ausiello as "shocking" and as if it was "ripped straight from The Wizard of Oz", and calls Romano "County General's very own Wicked Physician." In a review several years later for NJ.com, Alan Sepinwall called Romano's death "one of the silliest moments in ER history."

References

External links
Official NBC Character Bio

ER (TV series) characters
Fictional amputees
Fictional surgeons
Television characters introduced in 1997